In High Azure («В голубом просторе») is a painting by Russian artist Arkady Rylov (1870–1939), painted in 1918 in Petrograd. It is exhibited in the Tretiakov Gallery, Moscow.

Description 
At the background of high azure sky and snow-white clouds we can see swans flying over the dark blue sea. Massive cold snow-covered rocks are seen on the horizon. There is a ship under full sail adding to romantic character of the dark stormy sea. The swans' flight is free and easy as if they swim in light transparent air. The outline of the clouds over the horizon emphasizes the birds' flight direction. Though they move from right to left you do not feel that the motion continues beyond the bounds of the picture. Swans seem to move towards the sailing ship and go back ( over snow-covered rocks) to the right corner of the canvas.

Critics 
Aleksei Fedorov-Davydov

References

External links
 This artwork in the Tretyakov Gallery website

Collections of the Tretyakov Gallery
1918 paintings
Landscape paintings
Russian paintings
Birds in art
Maritime paintings